
Year 851 (DCCCLI) was a common year starting on Thursday (link will display the full calendar) of the Julian calendar.

Events 
 By place 
 Asia 
 Bagrat II Bagratuni, Armenian prince and leader of a rebellion against the Abbasid Caliphate, is captured by the Abbasid army, and brought to the caliphal capital of Samarra.

 Britain 
 Danish Viking raiders enter the Thames Estuary, and plunder Canterbury and London. They land at Wembury near Plymouth, but are defeated by Anglo-Saxon forces led by King Ethelwulf of Wessex. His eldest son Æthelstan of Kent, accompanied by Ealdorman Ealhhere, attacks a Viking fleet off the coast at Sandwich, and captures nine of the enemy vessels while the remainder flees.

 China 
 Suleiman al-Tajir, Muslim merchant and traveller, visits China during the Tang Dynasty. He observes the manufacturing of Chinese porcelain at Guangzhou, and writes of his admiration for its transparent quality. Suleiman also describes the mosque at Guangzhou, its granaries, its local government administration, some of its written records, and the treatment of travellers, along with the use of ceramics, rice wine, and tea (approximate date).

 Europe 
 August 22 – Battle of Jengland: Duke Erispoe takes command of the Breton forces after his father Nominoe, king of Brittany, dies. He continues an offensive against the Franks in alliance with Lambert II of Nantes. In Ille-et-Vilaine near Grand-Fougeray (Brittany), Erispoe defeats a Frankish-Saxon army (4,000 men) led by King Charles the Bald.
 Treaty of Angers: Charles the Bald meets Erispoe in Angers, and acknowledges him as "king of Brittany". He recognizes the authority of Breton rule over the areas around Nantes, Rennes and Pays de Retz, which become part of the Breton March, a border zone. Erispoe takes the oath to Charles as king of the West Frankish Kingdom (but not an hommage lige which would be an allegiance). To mark the sovereignty of the Breton state, the future Dukes of Brittany are crowned as "Duke, king in their lands".
 September – King Pepin II of Aquitaine is captured by the forces of Count Sans II Sancion, and handed over to Charles the Bald. He is detained in the monastery of Saint Medard in Soissons.
 Emperor Lothair I meets with his (half) brothers Louis the German and Charles the Bald in Meerssen (modern-day Netherlands), to continue the system of "con-fraternal government".
 King Íñigo Arista of Pamplona dies after a 27-year reign. He is succeeded by his son García Íñiguez, as king of Pamplona (later Navarra).

 By topic 
 Religion 
 The Great Mosque of Samarra (modern Iraq) is completed during the reign of Caliph Al-Mutawakkil.

Births 
 Otto I, duke of Saxony (approximate date)

Deaths 
 March 7 – Nominoe, king (or duke) of Brittany
 March 20 – Ebbo, archbishop of Reims
 July 16 – Sisenandus, deacon and martyr
 Cináed mac Conaing, king of Brega (Ireland)
 Ermengarde of Tours, Frankish empress
 Íñigo Arista, king of Pamplona (or 852)
 Ishaq ibn Yahya ibn Mu'adh, Muslim governor
 Mor Frideborg, Swedish noblewoman
 Muhammad ibn Ishaq, Muslim governor
 Ólchobar mac Cináeda, king of Munster (Ireland)
 Radelchis I, prince (or duke) of Benevento
 Siconulf, prince of Salerno (approximate date)
 Vlastimir, prince of Serbia (approximate date)
 Zhou Chi, chancellor of the Tang Dynasty (b. 793)

References

Sources